Saleh Al-Aulaqi (1938 – 30 April 1973) was a Yemeni politician and diplomat. Aulaqi was the foreign minister of South Yemen and a trade unionist.

References

1938 births
1973 deaths
South Yemeni people
20th-century Yemeni politicians
20th-century Yemeni diplomats
Yemeni trade unionists
Foreign ministers of Yemen